The Regional Environmental Protection Agency (Italian: Agenzia regionale per la protezione ambientale, ARPA) is the Italian environmental agency, one for each region of Italy (excluding Trentino-Alto Adige/Südtirol, which has been split for the two Autonomous Provinces of Trento and Bolzano).

Purposes
The agencies are under regional or provincial administration and their main role is the natural environmental protection of Italy, with the task of keep under control the natural environment and verify environmental regulations.

External links
Official websites of the agencies (all in Italian):

 Piedmont
 Tuscany
 Emilia-Romagna
 Liguria
 Aosta Valley
 Province of Trento
 Province of Bolzano
 Veneto
 Basilicata
 Marche
 Friuli-Venezia Giulia

 Umbria
 Campania
 Abruzzo
 Lazio
 Apulia
 Calabria
 Lombardy
 Molise
 Sicily
 Sardinia

Environmental protection agencies
Environment of Italy
Government agencies of Italy
Government agencies established in 1994
1994 establishments in Italy